'''Balda may refer to:
Balda, a character from the fairy tale by Alexander Pushkin The Tale of the Priest and of His Workman Balda
 ,  constituent locality of Sărmașu, Romania
 Balda, German company which produced Balda Baldessa cameras
Balda Canyon Natural Monument, Georgia
three villages: First Balda, Second Balda, Third Balda in Martvili Municipality, Georgia
Badla (2019 film), Indian Hindi-language mystery thriller
 Balda Group, a division of Stevanato Group
Baldemu language
Balda (name)